The 2024 United States Senate election in Maine will be held on November 5, 2024, to elect a member of the United States Senate to represent the state of Maine. Incumbent two-term Senator Angus King, who is an Independent but caucuses with the Democratic Party, was re-elected with 54% of the vote in 2018, and is expected to run for a third term.

Independents

Candidates

Announcement pending
Angus King, incumbent U.S. Senator

Democratic primary

Candidates

Potential
Jared Golden, U.S. Representative for Maine's 2nd congressional district

General election

Predictions

References

2024
Maine
United States Senate